The 1991 Volvo San Marino Open was a women's tennis tournament played on outdoor clay courts at the Centro Sportivo Tennis in the City of San Marino, San Marino that was part of the Tier V category of the 1991 WTA Tour. It was the inaugural edition of the WTA San Marino and was held from 15 July until 21 July 1991. Second-seeded Katia Piccolini won the singles title and earned $13,500 first-prize money.

Finals

Singles

 Katia Piccolini defeated  Silvia Farina 6–2, 6–3
 It was Piccolini's only singles title of her career.

Doubles

 Kerry-Anne Guse /  Akemi Nishiya defeated  Laura Garrone /  Mercedes Paz 6–0, 6–3

See also
 1991 Campionati Internazionali di San Marino – men's tournament

References

External links
 ITF tournament edition details
 Tournament draws

WTA San Marino
WTA San Marino
1991 in San Marino
San Marino